Novoshipunovo is a rural locality (a selo) and the administrative center of Novoshipunovsky Selsoviet, Krasnoshchyokovsky District, Altai Krai, Russia. The population was 1,177 as of 2016. There are 13 streets.

Geography 
Novoshipunovo is located 58 km east of Krasnoshchyokovo (the district's administrative centre) by road. Maralikha is the nearest rural locality.

References 

Rural localities in Krasnoshchyokovsky District